Joe Labero (born 28 July 1963 in Alvesta, Sweden) is a Swedish magician. Joe Labero is a stage name derived from his birthname:  Lars Bengt Roland Johansson.

Illusionist career 
At the age of 12 years Labero got his first magic kit. At first he called himself "Magino" and 1979 he won the Swedish junior championships of magic that was held in Karlstad. He met his mentor, the Swedish magician Carlo Tornedo. Carlo told him to use the first 2 letters in his name to create "Joe Labero" and he has now registered that name for official use.

In 1991, he put up his first big production A Magic Night at Berns in Stockholm. The show was a great success and was sold out and performed 657 times. The show was shown all over Sweden and abroad for the following years. He toured until 1995.

In 1996 he premiered in Danze Fantasy Productions new show Mystique at Conrad Jupiters Casino in Australia which ran for 16 months. The next year he presented another show there and called it Illusions. In 1998 he took Illusions to Sweden. Together with the original performers he made a huge success and performed this show until 1999 when he remade it and called it Joe Labero show and performed it until 2002 all over Sweden.

After this he created the Castle Tour in Sweden which was more intimate with the audience and he continued to use a similar theme later at the Ship of Illusions tour when traveling by boat around Scandinavia.

Together with the piano artist Robert Wells he created Rhapsody in Rock with Magic. This was a big show that combined live orchestral music with magic. They started in 2002 and met again using the same concept in the Christmas Spectacular Show.

In 2003 Labero had over 30 Ship of Illusions shows along the Scandinavian coast. Bill Clinton attended one of the shows.

In September 2007 his show Invited to Labero with an Asian theme started at Rondo in Gothenburg, Sweden. In 2010 the show was shown over 300 times and sold over 300.000 tickets.

In 2010 Labero hosted magic shows in Hamburger Börs in Stockholm, from 10 September to 30 October.

In November 2010 Labero hosted a six-month-long magic show at Jupiters Casino in Australia. The show was produced by Danze Fantasy Productions.

In 2018 Labero landed his newest show "INFERNO: The Fire Spectacular" in Las Vegas at the Paris Hotel and Casino.

Awards
In July 2009 Labero received the award "Illusionist of the decade" in connection with the magic World Cup in Beijing, which was held from 26–31 July 2009. Previously this award has been received by David Copperfield and Siegfried & Roy. It intends world touring illusions during the years 2000–2009. The prize is awarded by The Merlin Award Society, which is the Oscar organization of the magic world and is based in Las Vegas.

Private life
Labero is engaged to International Photographer Anna Vinterfall. Together they have a daughter named Nicole  Vinterfall Labero who was born on 12 January 2008.

Filmography
Illusioner (1994)

References

External links
Joe Labero's official website

1963 births
Living people
Swedish magicians
People from Alvesta Municipality